Mahmoud Abdel-Aal (11 February 1929 – 4 April 2010) was an Egyptian gymnast. He competed in the 1948 Summer Olympics.

References

1929 births
2010 deaths
Gymnasts at the 1948 Summer Olympics
Egyptian male artistic gymnasts
Olympic gymnasts of Egypt